The Joseph E. and Mina W. Mickelsen House is a historic house located at 782 East Pioneer Road in Draper, Utah.

Description and history 
Constructed by Cyrus W. Vawdrey in 1929, it is a one-story, hip-roofed, Bungalow-style brick house with wide eaves. Originally located at 1020 East Pioneer Road, the house was moved to its present location on August 7, 2002, to make way for the Draper City municipal building.

It was listed on the National Register of Historic Places on May 6, 2004.

References

Houses on the National Register of Historic Places in Utah
Houses completed in 1929
Houses in Salt Lake County, Utah
National Register of Historic Places in Salt Lake County, Utah
Buildings and structures in Draper, Utah
Bungalow architecture in Utah